The Commander, Task Force 75 (CTF 75), properly named Navy Expeditionary Forces Command Pacific; or simply NEFCPAC (pronounced "nef-see-pack"), is a US Navy task force of the United States Seventh Fleet and is 7th Fleet's primary expeditionary task force composed of EOD, Coastal Riverine, Cargo Handling, and Seabee detachments.  CTF 75 is responsible for the planning and execution of coastal riverine operations, explosive ordnance disposal, diving, expeditionary logistics, engineering and construction, and underwater construction. Additionally, it provides direct support to salvage operations and expeditionary intelligence throughout the Indo-Pacific region as directed by 7th Fleet.

CTF 75 is permanently headquartered at Camp Covington, Guam.

Detachments
The following is a list of detachments under CTF 75 operational control:

History
For the landings on Hollandia during World War II, Task Force 75, then as now part of the Seventh Fleet, was made up of Phoenix, Nashville, Boise, and a number of destroyers, including Hutchins, Daly, and Abner Read.

During the Vietnam War, Task Force 75 was the Surface Combatant Force assigned to Seventh Fleet, responsible for the cruisers and destroyers that were not escorting aircraft carrier. Rear Admiral Rembrandt C. Robinson, at age 47, was Commander Cruiser Destroyer Flotilla Eleven and Commander, Cruiser Destroyer Group Vietnam, Seventh Fleet (CTF 75). Admiral Robinson was killed in a helicopter crash in the Gulf of Tonkin on May 8, 1972, during a late night landing approach to his flagship, the guided missile light cruiser . The Seventh Fleet's flagship used to be frequently a cruiser. This cruiser, for example USS Oklahoma City (CG-5), would be assigned the designation of Task Group 70.1 when acting as fleet flagship and also act as part of Task Force 75 when carrying out Naval gunfire support.

Events and milestones
17 January 2014 – The US Navy sends out a notice "establishing Navy Expeditionary Forces Command Pacific" and begins gathering approvals from other type commands.
1 July 2014 – NEFCPAC initial operational capability established.
9 January 2015 – NEFCPAC is officially established.

See also
Task Force 73

References

External links
Commander 7th Fleet Website

United States Navy task forces
Military units and formations established in 2014
2014 establishments in the United States